Cenizas is a studio album by Chilean-American musician Nicolás Jaar. It was released on March 27, 2020, by Other People.

Critical reception

Cenizas was met with universal acclaim from critics. At Metacritic, which assigns a weighted average rating out of 100 to reviews from mainstream publications, this release received an average score of 82, based on 7 reviews.

Track listing

Charts

References

2020 albums
Nicolas Jaar albums